This is a list of French women's football transfers in the summer transfer window 2015. Division 1 Féminine clubs are listed according to the 2014-15 season table.

Division 1 Féminine

In
 As of 11 October 2015. Source: Soccerdonna 

 1 On loan
 2 Back from loan

Out
 As of 11 October 2015. Source: Soccerdonna 

 1 On loan
 2 Back from loan

See also
 2015–16 Division 1 Féminine

References

External links
 FFF website

French women's
Transfers
2015